Hernán Carazo (born 16 August 1955) is a Costa Rican biathlete. He competed in the 20 km individual event at the 1984 Winter Olympics.

References

1955 births
Living people
Costa Rican male biathletes
Olympic biathletes of Costa Rica
Biathletes at the 1984 Winter Olympics
Sportspeople from San José, Costa Rica